Broadbent's filter model is an early selection theory of attention.

Description 

Donald Broadbent based the development of the filter model from findings by Kennith Craik, who took an engineering approach to cognitive processes. Cherry and Broadbent were concerned with the issue of selective attention. Broadbent was the first to describe the human attentional processing system using an information processing metaphor.  In this view, Broadbent proposed a so-called "early selection" view of attention, such that humans process information with limited capacity and select information to be processed early.

Due to this limited capacity, a selective filter is needed for information processing. Broadbent stated that all stimuli are processed initially for basic physical properties.  These basic characteristics can include pitch, color, loudness, and direction. Unlike the physical properties, Broadbent believed semantic features, due to their complexity, would impose a limited capacity on the temporary storehouse of incoming stimuli.  Therefore, based on physical characteristics, the selective filter allows for certain stimuli to pass through the filter for further processing, while unattended stimuli will be filtered out and lost. Further, goal-directed behaviour requires attention to be controlled; hence a high degree of selectivity is put forth in the information-processing stream. When developing his model, Broadbent emphasized the splitting of incoming stimuli to attended or unattended channels. Channel selection is guided through attention. If one is attempting to attend to a stimulus based on their current goals, they will employ voluntary attention; whereas if a sensory event catches one's attention, reflexive attention will be employed. Information selected to pass through the filter is then available for short-term memory and manipulation of the selected information, prior to storage in long-term memory.

Filter theory then postulates that a selective filter is needed to cope with the overwhelming amount of information entering the channels, such that certain messages must be inhibited or filtered out from the messages that were filtered for further processing.  Filter theory reflects an early selection theory because certain information is selected and attended to at a very early stage of information processing.

During his experimentation, Broadbent made use of the dichotic listening test. This task has been used extensively to test numerous psychological phenonomena such as response times of specific auditory information, as well as testing for attended and unattended information presented to a participant. It is widely used as it is a non-invasive method of testing cerebral dominance. In a typical dichotic listening paradigm, the participant is wearing a headphone, in which a different auditory stimuli are presented to each ear at the same time, and the participant's attention is divided. The participant is instructed to attend (attended channel) the information coming from one of the ear pieces and neglect (unattended channel) the information presented from the other. Following the listening period, the participants are tested on whether they recall any information presented in the unattended channel.

Early research using dichotic listening tasks provided empirical evidence of participants' ability to correctly recall information to the attended channel, and poor recalling in the unattended channel. Broadbent used this paradigm in his split-scan experiments, in which he presented participants with different letters in each ear simultaneously and instructed them to repeat them in any order.  It resulted in reporting the letters presented to one ear first and then the letters presented from the other ear.  This supports Broadbent's filter theory and an early selection model because participants filtered the information based on ear. Participants were then told to repeat the letters in the order they were presented.  Accuracy of their answers dropped significantly, which again supports Broadbent's filter theory and an early selection model because switching from ear to ear is difficult and goes against the filter.

Modern views of Broadbent's model 

As psychological research has improved immensely since Broadbent's time, more sophisticated measures indicate that we do have an attentional filter, though it is integrated into a broader cognitive system. This system compensates for the controversies of limited parallel processing in Broadbent's original findings.  A major component of the system entails sensory memory, which is broken down into iconic memory and echoic memory. The aforementioned represent visual and auditory memory respectively, which function preattentively. Given the existence of such a preattentive memory store makes it possible for preattentive stimuli to work in a serial manner.  Research on iconic memory has provided a visual hierarchy of the visual system, which indicates specific neurons are activated before stimulus recognition, supporting Broadbent's theory of preattentive processing.

Additionally, research has shown that physical features of a stimulus guide attentional selection.  It has been found consistently that observers correctly separate relevant from irrelevant stimuli due to physical rather than semantic features, indicating selection channels are heavily influenced by physical features.  This then further supports Broadbent's research. According to the modality effect, echoic memory has an advantage over iconic memory. Research has shown that the speech is more apt to objective interpretation than inputs to the visual system. This indicates that auditory information is first processed for its physical features, and then combined with visual information features.

Moreover, allocation of attention is a product of both voluntary and reflexive attention. Goals and behaviors drive attention but may be influenced by an exogenous stimulus of particular stimulus strength, which varies by situation. Such research evidence confirms Broadbent's notion of voluntary attentional mechanisms.

More recent research finds that Broadbent's model neglected to address the time requirements of shifting attention. However, he did distinguish that internal and external stimuli can cause shifts of attention, though he did not consider that internally and externally driven shifts of attention may have differing time courses.  Others, such as Treisman, believed that Broadbent's model did not account for all such findings.  Treisman, who was one of Broadbent's PhD students, proposed feature integration theory, which asserted that to form a perceptual object, we must first look at its features in the preattentive stage and then bind them in the focus attention stage. Treisman stated that instead of a filter, people have an attenuator and it identifies messages based on its physical properties or by higher level characteristics, such as meaning.  Attended messages can be perceived, but according to Treisman's model, unattended messages can be perceived but at a lesser strength, which happens instead of the unattended message being blocking it. These findings based on feature integration theory and the attenuation model contradicted those of Broadbent's model because Broadbent stated that people could not make meaningful connections.

Attention
Attention is commonly understood as the ability to select some things while ignoring others. Attention is controllable, selective, and limited. It is the progression by which external stimuli form internal representations that gain conscious awareness. Attention is part of nearly every waking moment for humans, as it is the focusing of one's thoughts.  Selective attention utilizes cognitive processes to focus on relevant targets on input, thoughts or actions while neglecting irrelevant sources of input. This is the basis for how we attend to specific stimuli. Voluntary attention, otherwise known as top-down attention, is the aspect over which we have control, enabling us to act in a goal-directed manner.  In contrast, reflexive attention is driven by exogenous stimuli redirecting our current focus of attention to a new stimulus, thus it is a bottom-up influence. These two divisions of attention are continuously competing to be the momentary foci of attention.  Selection models of attention theorize how specific stimuli gain our awareness.  Early selection models emphasize physical features of stimuli are attended to, while late selection models argue that semantic features are what determine our current focus of attention. These selection models are utilized by researchers to propose when stimulus information is attended to.

Early selection models of attention

The early selection model of attention, proposed by Broadbent, posits that stimuli are filtered, or selected to be attended to, at an early stage during processing. A filter can be regarded as the selector of relevant information based on basic features, such as color, pitch, or direction of stimuli. After stimuli are presented, the information is temporarily held in a preattentive store. Information with similar characteristics pass through the filter and is attended to so it can be processed for meaning; irrelevant attention is filtered out. The basic idea proposes that perception of the stimulus is not required prior to selecting its relevance.

Broadbent showed evidence of early selection using a split-span technique. Participants were presented with a different list of digits in each ear. When asked to report the digits they heard, participants tended to report all digits presented to one ear first and then the digits reported to the second ear, regardless of the order in which the digits were presented. When asked to report the digits they heard in the order they were presented, accuracy dropped. This study suggested that information is filtered according to basic characteristics of the stimuli (e.g., the ear in which it was presented). Participants first reported the information from one ear and then switched filters in order to report the digits presented to the second ear. Therefore, when required to report the digits in the order they were presented, participants had to continuously switch filters, which impacted accuracy.

Neural basis of early selection for visual inputs may reside in the primary visual cortex, also called V1, the first stage in the neocortex along the visual pathway for visual input information from the retina  --- evidence has been accumulating in support of the V1 Saliency Hypothesis (V1SH) proposed in the late 1990s that V1 creates a bottom-up saliency map to guide attention exogenously, and thus selection for visual inputs starts at V1.

Late selection models of attention

Late selection models argue that information is selected after processing for meaning, as opposed to during the earlier stages of processing. According to these models, all information is attended to, whether intentionally or unintentionally.  Information inputs are processed equivalently, until semantic encoding and analysis can be performed. The filter merely acts as an information attenuator; it intensifies the pertinent information and attenuates the intensity of the stimuli deemed to be unimportant. This notion implies that internal decisions of stimuli relevance must be made, before allowing it to gain conscious awareness.

Gray and Wedderburn  showed evidence of late selection using a split-span technique similar to Broadbent. This time, participants heard a mixture of numbers and words presented to each ear, such as, "Dear – 7 – Jane" in the left ear and, "9 – Aunt – 6" in the right ear and were asked to report back what they heard. According to the early selection model, participants should have reported all items presented to one ear first, and the items presented to the other ear second.  However, the researchers found that participants reported hearing, "Dear Aunt Jane" and "9 – 7 – 6". This study suggested that stimuli are not selected based on physical characteristics (e.g., location of sound) determined by the filter but according to meaning.

Attenuation model of attention

Anne Treisman, though influenced by Broadbent's work, was not fully convinced by the notion of a filter performing decisions as to what stimuli gain conscious awareness. She proposed an alternative mechanism, attenuation theory. This theory supports an early-selection filter. However, in this case, the filter also  attenuates  stimuli presented to the unattended channel.  If the stimuli pass a threshold, it will leak through the filter and can be attended to. As the unattended channel includes weakly attended to information, to gain conscious awareness this information must surpass a threshold, which Treisman believed was determined by the words' meaning.  Important words (such as one's name) would have a low threshold, to easily gain awareness, whereas unimportant words (such as "lamp") would have a higher threshold to prevent them from gaining awareness inappropriately. In this way, the threshold for each word acts as a filtering mechanism, relying on semantic features.

Memory selection model of attention

Deutsch and Norman were not fully convinced by Broadbent's selection criteria based solely on physical features of a stimulus. For example, the cocktail party effect influenced researchers to look further than physical selection features, to semantic selecting features. The cocktail party effect is an example of how unattended information can gain one's attention. Suppose you were at a social gathering having a conversation with some friends, when you hear someone in a different conversation mention your name and it grasps your attention. This unattended-to information somehow gained your attention and was processed beyond its physical characteristics, for its meaning. Deutsch and Deutsch proposed a late selection model and suggested that people can recognize the information from both channels, but if the information does not have any personal relevance, the information will be forgotten.  Therefore, the issue is not a lack of perceptual processing, but rather the information has not entered into memory.  Norman stated that not only is personal relevance necessary for attention, but so is the strength of the stimuli. This fueled the development of the memory selection model, which shares the same basic principle of early selection models that stimulus features are selected via their physical properties.  However, attended and unattended information pass through the filter, to a second stage of selection on the basis of semantic characteristics or message content. Items which are selected are incorporated into short-term memory. Therefore, it is the second selection mechanism, rather than the filter, decides what information is attended to.

Multimode model of attention

Additional research proposes the notion of a moveable filter. The multimode theory of attention combines physical and semantic inputs into one theory. Within this model, attention is assumed to be flexible, allowing different depths of perceptual analysis. Which feature gathers awareness is dependent upon the person's needs at the time. Switching from physical and semantic features as a basis for selection yields costs and benefits. Stimulus information will be attended to via an early selection through sensory analysis, then as it increases in complexity, semantic analysis is involved, compensating for attention's limited capacity. Shifting from early to late selection models reduces the significance of stimuli rendering one's attention, though it increases breadth of attention. Research has found that semantic selection requires a greater attentional resources than physical selection.

Capacity model of attention

Daniel Kahneman took a different approach to describing attention, by describing its division, rather than selection mechanisms. He describes attention as a resource in which energy or mental effort is required. Mental effort is used while engaging in performing any mental task, and the greater the complexity, the greater the effort needed to solve a task.  Kahneman believes there are three basic conditions which needed to be met for proper completion of a task. By combining total attentional capacity, momentary mental effort, and appropriate allocation policy of the attentional capacity, a person will exert enough mental effort to overcome mental tasks. The key component is allocating enough attention, as a resource, to the task at hand. Kahneman also noted that arousal influences the total attentional capacity in any given situation. In addition, his model incorporates the ideas of voluntary and reflexive attention, which affect allocation policy. In order to direct attention appropriately, one must attend to relevant information, while neglecting irrelevant information to prevent becoming distracted. This mental effort theory proposed by Kahneman provides an overview of the influences and interdependencies of attention allocation, which is meant to supplement attention selection models.

References

Attention